The Hinterwald is an old local breed of cattle from the Black Forest (Germany). There are breed associations in Germany and one in Switzerland.

Etymology 
The Hinterwälder (literally "from the backwoods") adopted its name about 150 years ago, when they were distinguished from their somewhat larger sister breed, the Vorderwälder (literally "from the frontwoods").

The scientific name is Bos primigenius f. taurus.

Characteristics 
The cattle is small. The head is mostly white, the remainder of the coat being pied light yellow to dark red-brown. Having been bred to cope with extreme conditions, such as cold winters, steep pastures and a frugal diet, they are well adapted to the Alpine climate. They are used for both beef and milk production and are noted for their thriftiness, longevity and lack of calving difficulties.

These qualities have led to a significant rise in the number of Hinterwald cows in the Swiss Alps since the introduction of a breeding programme initiated by ProSpecieRara, a non-profit organisation dedicated to the preservation of endangered domestic species. However, the breed is still endangered. The government of Baden-Württemberg pays husbandry bonuses to conserve it.

The breed was "Domestic Animal of the Year" (Haustier des Jahres) in Germany in 1992.

Photo gallery

See also 

 Vorderwald (Vorderwälder Rind)
 Black Forest
 Black Forest Horse (Schwarzwälder Kaltblut)

References

External links 
 "Hinterwälder Rind" cattle profile by ProSpecieRara (NPO from )
"Hinterwälder" cattle profile by ASR (breeding association from Southern )
 Macaulay Institute study of Black Forest farming
 Gefährdete Nutztiere - Informationen der Gesellschaft zur Erhaltung alter und gefährdeter Haustierrassen e.V.
 Information from a cattle farmer
 Photos of the Hinterwald cattle

Black Forest
Cattle breeds originating in Germany
Animal breeds on the GEH Red List